Old Bottles - New Wine is an album by trombonist Ray Anderson which was recorded in 1985 and released on the Enja label.

Reception

The Allmusic review by Scott Yanow stated "Trombonist Ray Anderson, best-known for his avant-garde recordings, surprised many with these explorations of standards. His high-note outbursts are often hilarious, yet on this program he really digs into the material".

Track listing
 "Love Me or Leave Me" (Walter Donaldson, Gus Kahn) – 4:52
 "Bohemia After Dark" (Oscar Pettiford) – 5:18
 "La Rosita" (Allan Stuart, Paul Dupont) – 6:32
 "Ow!" (Dizzy Gillespie) – 3:38
 "In a Mellow Tone" (Duke Ellington) – 6:28
 "Laird Baird" (Charlie Parker) – 5:44
 "Wine" (Reginald Beam, Avon Long) – 6:49

Personnel
Ray Anderson – trombone, vocals
Kenny Barron – piano
Cecil McBee – bass
Dannie Richmond – drums

References

Ray Anderson (musician) albums
1985 albums
Enja Records albums